Gursharan Singh (September 16, 1929 – September 27, 2011) was a writer, political activist and a progressive director of Punjabi drama who played the part of Bhai Manna Singh in a popular Punjabi TV serial drama on DD Punjabi . He became known as Bhai Manna Singh among Punjab residents also work in the punjabi movie Man Jeete Jag Jeet(1973) he played Radha Saluja's father,Mutiyar (1979) an Soorma Bhagat (1993). He won the Kalidaasa Award in 2004 and died in Chandigarh at the age of 82.Bhaiji was written and played first drama on Nagal Dam as a engineer.

Movies

 Man Jeete Jag Jeet (1973) as Gani ji  
 Mutiyar (1979) as Master Ji
 Soorma Bhagat (1993)
 Dastan-e-Punjab- TV  Series
 Bhai Manna Singh- on DD Punjabi

References 

Indian male writers
Indian theatre directors
1929 births
2011 deaths
People from Multan
Recipients of the Sangeet Natak Akademi Award